The Niagara Parks Police Service provides policing services for the Niagara Parks Commission in Niagara Falls, Niagara-on-the-Lake and Fort Erie, Ontario, Canada. First established in 1887, the Niagara Parks Police Service is one of the oldest police services in Canada.

Overview
Officers of Niagara Parks Police are designated Special Constables who have been conferred the full powers of a police officer and like all police officers in the Province of Ontario, receive their Basic Constable Training at the Ontario Police College in Aylmer. The service is primarily responsible for approximately 3274 acres of parkland along 56 kilometers of highway owned and operated under the Niagara Parks Commission; however, the Niagara Regional Police maintain jurisdictional authority over all areas of the Niagara Region, including the Niagara Parks.
The appointment authority for the Niagara Parks Police is given by the Niagara Regional Police Services Board and by the Ministry of Community Safety and Corrections of Ontario, and must be renewed every five years.

The Niagara Parks Police are fully funded from the budget of the Niagara Parks Commission, an agency of the Province of Ontario, and operate with an annual budget of approximately $3.6 million.

In addition to general uniformed patrol, the Niagara Parks Police employ three specialized units: The High Angle River Team (HART), which consists of officers specially trained in high angle rescue techniques and who have been responsible for the rescue of numerous tourists, stuntmen, and mentally disturbed individuals since its inception; the Marine Unit which, along with the Niagara Regional Police Service patrols both the upper and lower Niagara Rivers; and, as of 2011, the Niagara Parks Police have established their first Canine Unit consisting of one handler and his dog "Nia" trained in search and rescue and explosives detection. In summer 2013, K-9 Nia retired due to a chronic illness which prevented her from continuing as an active police dog. In September 2013 new police K-9 Cinder began his training as Nia's replacement.

The Niagara Parks Police are responsible for, but not limited to, the following:
 Discretionary enforcement of the Criminal Code, Controlled Drugs and Substances Act, Highway Traffic Act, Trespass to Property Act, Liquor License Act.
 Management of the vehicle and pedestrian traffic throughout the Niagara Parks.
 Maintaining the peace
 Ensuring the safe return of lost and found property to its rightful owners

During peak tourist season the Parks Police employ approximately thirty students, most of whom are participants in local law and security courses. These unarmed members hold the designation of Provincial Offenses Officer and are primarily responsible for the orderly flow of traffic and parking offenses.

In 2010, the Niagara Parks Police faced the possibility of disbandment as they were embroiled in a provincial challenge to the way special constables are viewed and concerns surrounding their use of firearms. However, after months of debate, an official agreement was reached to renew the Service's Special Constable Status, allowing it to continue operating without change.

Chiefs of Police

There have been 15 Chiefs of Police since the formation of the Niagara Parks Police in 1887. The current Chief of the Niagara Parks Police Service is Paul Forcier   http://www.iheartradio.ca/610cktb/news/new-chief-named-for-niagara-parks-police-1.9193277, who replaced the terminated Mark McMullen who was a Superintendent with the Niagara Regional Police Service.  https://www.niagaraparks.com/media-room/releases/mark-mcmullen-named-niagara-parks-police-chief/
 William Bowman (1887–1904)
 James Wilcox (1904-1908)
 Joseph Vandersluys (1908-1913)
 J. Harrison Plw (1913-1920)
 John Jackson (1920-1924)
 Charles Atcherly (1924-1940)
 Cyril Bratley (1940-1957)
 Edwin Rehfeld (1957-1967)
 Wilfred J. Derbyshire (1967-1993)
 Raymond G. Vassallo (1993-2003)
 Timothy Berndt (2003-2008)
 Douglas Kane (2008-2013)
 Carl Scott (2013–2017)
 Mark McMullen (2017-2019)
 Paul Forcier (2019-   )

Ranks

Uniform

Sworn constables wear traditional police navy blue uniform shirts and cargo pants with red stripe while student Provincial Offences Officers wear a light blue uniform shirts. Jackets are dark navy blue and headgear consists of traditional  police cap some times replaced with a ball cap, both bearing the Niagara Parks Police Crest. Yellow reflective vests are worn by traffic officers.

Equipment

Although the Niagara Parks Police are Special Constables, the sworn full-time officers are among the few Special Constables in Canada authorized to carry firearms on top of other standard equipment such as handcuffs, telescopic baton, pepper spray, two way radios, similar to that of other police services across Canada. Seasonal Provincial Offences Officers are not trained or authorized to carry any form of use of force equipment and therefore carry only two way radios for communication.

Headquarters

The Niagara Parks Police Headquarters is located at 6075 Niagara Parkway, Niagara Falls, Ontario, directly across from the American Falls in the former Administrative Building of the Niagara Parks Commission.

Fleet

Vehicles
 Unmarked Ford Explorer - Chief of Police's vehicle
 20 ft Medeiros Patrol Boat
 Ford Police Interceptor Utility
 Ford Explorer - Canine Unit
 Ford F150 pickup - Canine Unit
 Chevy Silverado crew cab pickup - High Angle River Team
 Harley Davidson Motorcycle
 BMW F 650 GS motorcycle
 GMC Canyon - Provincial Offences Officer

Bicycles
 10 Giant Bicycles

Past vehicles

 GMC Jimmy
 Jeep Cherokee
 Dodge Diplomat cruisers
 Ford Crown Victoria LTD cruiser
 GMC Vandura vans
 Ford Crown Victoria Police Interceptor
 Chevy Tahoe
 Ford Police Interceptor Sedan
 Ford Escape

See also
 Niagara Regional Police Service
 New York State Park Police Niagara Region / Region 13

References

External links
 

Law enforcement agencies of Ontario
Regional Municipality of Niagara
Niagara Falls, Ontario
Government agencies established in 1887
1887 establishments in Ontario
Niagara Parks Commission